Geoffrey Strachan is a noted translator of French and German literature into English. He is best known for his renderings of the novels of French-Russian writer Andreï Makine. In addition, he has also translated works by Yasmina Réza, Nathacha Appanah, Elie Wiesel and Jérôme Ferrari. Uniquely, he has won both the Scott-Moncrieff Prize (for translation from French) and the Schlegel-Tieck Prize (for translation from German).

Selected translations

Andrei Makine
 A Hero's Daughter 
 A Life's Music 
 Brief Loves That Live Forever
 Confessions of a Lapsed Standard-bearer
 Human Love
 Le Testament Francais
 Music of a Life
 Once Upon the River Love
 Requiem for a Lost Empire 
 The Crime of Olga Arbyelina
 The Earth and Sky of Jacques Dorme
 The Life of an Unknown Man  
 The Woman Who Waited

Others
 Elie Wiesel: The Judges
 Irenäus Eibl-Eibesfeldt: Love and Hate
 Jerome Ferrari: Where I Left My Soul 
 Melita Maschmann: Account Rendered: A Dossier on my Former Self 
 Nathacha Appanah: The Last Brother 
 Yasmina Reza: Adam Haberberg

References

Living people
Year of birth missing (living people)
German–English translators
21st-century British translators
20th-century British translators